Focused was a hardcore punk band that originated out of Long Beach, California in 1991, with a Christian hardcore style. The band broke up in 1996, but reunited briefly in 2009.

History 

Focused began in 1991, created by Tim Mann on vocals, John Schoettler on rhythm guitar, Matt Archuletta on bass, and Jeff Boetto (No For An Answer, Half-Off), on lead guitar. The band played their first song live at a local talent show without an official drummer and asked their friend David Shoemaker to fill-in for that one night. The band would soon bring on Al Christensen on drums. The band played their first official show alongside bands such as Mean Season, Unbroken, and Strife. The following night the band played their second official show at the Irvine Bren Events Center alongside bands such The Crucified, Mortal and Deliverance. The band recorded two demos, 'Situation Within’ in 1991 and At Eternity's Gate in 1993.

By mid-1992, Boetto and Archuleta had left, to be replaced by Mike Merryman on lead guitar and Dirk Lemmenes on bass. Schoettler left in mid-1993 after recording At Eternity’s Gate; Jason Parker replaced him.  This new line-up signed with Tooth & Nail Records, and began recording their debut album, Bow, which was released as the label's second release. Shortly after the release of that album, Parker departed and Andrew Reizuch took his place on tour. Christensen left the band in 1994, and was replaced by Chris Bowden. Chris Bowden and Andrew Reizuch would be part of the new line-up to write and record their second album.

In 1994, the band embarked on a tour called 40 Days and 40 Nights, alongside Chatterbox and Unashamed. They also met with Blenderhead and MxPx on that tour at a few shows. The tour lasted from June 24 to July 30. They toured with Bloodshed the following year, and began working on their second album, The Hope That Lies Within, also released on Tooth & Nail. It received an enthusiastic, ten-bar rating from Cross Rhythms. In 1996, the band broke up.

In 2000, Mann brought the band back together to release the three-song 2000 EP. The lineup at the time consisted of new members aside from Mann, with Brett Barber and Gary Wilson on guitars, Jim Rupe (ex-Every Day Life) on bass, and Adam Valles on drums.

They were asked to play on Demon Hunter's "Huntour" in 2009, along with Living Sacrifice, Throwdown, Advent and others. The classic line-up of Mann, Merryman, Parker, and Lemmenes, with former Project 86 drummer Alex Albert joining the band on drums, participated in the tour.

In 2019, Steadfast Records, a record label that had released the debut Zao album, All Else Failed, announced the re-release of Focused's demo At Eternity's Gate, which would include vinyl and CDs.

Members

2009 reunion lineup

Other former members

Live musicians
 David Shoemaker – drums (1991)

Timeline

Discography
Studio albums
 Bow (1993, Tooth & Nail Records)
 The Hope That Lies Within (1995, Tooth & Nail Records)

EPs
 At Eternity's Gate (2019, Steadfast Records) 

Compilation albums
 The Wheels of Progress (1992–1996) (1999, Gunshow Records)

Demos
 Situation Within (1991)
 Eternity's Gate (1993)

Awards
Dove Awards
 1996 - Hard Music Album: The Hope that Lies Within (nominated)

References

External links
Focused on Myspace

Tooth & Nail Records artists
Musical groups established in 1990
Musical groups disestablished in 1996
Musical groups reestablished in 2009
American hardcore punk groups
Metalcore musical groups from California